Freedom, generally, is the ability or right to change or act without constraint.

Freedom may also refer to:

Philosophy 
 Artistic freedom, freedom of expression and publication
 Autonomy, the capacity to make an informed, un-coerced decision
 Freedom of choice, an individual's opportunity and autonomy
 Freedom of speech, the right to communicate one's opinions and ideas
 Freedom of thought, the freedom of an individual to hold or consider a fact, viewpoint, or thought, independent of others' viewpoints
 Free will, the ability to choose between courses of action
 Civil liberties, personal guarantees and freedoms that government cannot abridge without due process
 Liberty, the ability to do as one pleases
 Moral responsibility, the status of deserving praise or blame for an act or omission
 Rights, legal, social, or ethical principles of freedom or entitlement

Computing
 Freedom (application), a software utility designed to allow a person to block their own access to the Internet for a set period of time
 Freedom! (video game), a 1992 educational computer game on the history of slavery
 Internet freedom, an umbrella term that encompasses digital rights, freedom of information, the right to Internet access, freedom from Internet censorship, and net neutrality
 Software freedom, a social movement promoting the freedom to run, study and change software

Transport
 Freedom Yachts, an American yacht builder and several of their models
 Freedom (yacht), a 12-metre class racing yacht and winner of the 1980 America's Cup
 Brutsche Freedom 40, an American homebuilt aircraft design
 Colyaer Freedom S100, a Spanish ultralight aircraft
 Freedom-class littoral combat ship, warships of the United States Navy
 Freedom-class cruise ship, operated by Royal Caribbean International
 USS Freedom, any of three US Navy ships
 Freedom Ship, a concept for a floating city
 Pro-Composites Freedom, an American homebuilt aircraft design
 Space Station Freedom, an uncompleted NASA project
 Freedom Bridge (South Sudan), a bridge under construction in South Sudan
 Elation Freedom, an electric hypercar
 Crew Dragon Freedom, a SpaceX crew capsule

Places

United States 
Freedom, California
Freedom, Georgia
Freedom, Idaho and Wyoming
Freedom, Indiana
Freedom, Kentucky
Freedom, Maine
Freedom, Michigan
Freedom, Missouri
Freedom, New Hampshire
Freedom, Nebraska
Freedom, New York
Freedom, Ohio (disambiguation)
Freedom, Oklahoma
Freedom, Pennsylvania
Freedom, Utah
Freedom, Forest County, Wisconsin
Freedom, Outagamie County, Wisconsin
Freedom (community), Outagamie County, Wisconsin
Freedom, Sauk County, Wisconsin
Freedom County, Washington, an unrecognized county
Freedom Township (disambiguation), several places

Arts and entertainment

Books
 Freedom (Franzen novel), a 2010 novel by Jonathan Franzen
 Freedom (Safire novel), a 1987 novel by William Safire
 Freedom™, a 2010 novel by Daniel Suarez
 Freedom, original title of Freedom, Vol. 1: Freedom in the Making of Western Culture, a 1991 history by Orlando Patterson
 FREEDOM!, a 2014 philosophical treatise by Adam Kokesh

Film and television
 Freedom (Yoko Ono film), a 1970 short film
 Freedom (1982 film), an Australian film directed by Scott Hicks
 Freedom (2000 film), a film directed by Šarūnas Bartas
 Freedom (2001 film), an Argentine film
 Freedom (2014 film), an American film
 Freedom (2019 film), a Spanish film
 Freedom (TV series), a short-lived television series in 2000
 Freedom (NCIS), a 2011 episode of the American police procedural drama
 "Freedom" (The Following), a 2014 episode of the psychological thriller
 Freedom Project, a Japanese promotional video animation series

Music
 Freedom (band), a psychedelic rock band
 Freedom (Canadian band) aka Freedom North, a Canadian rock band from the 1970s
 Freedom (concert), a 2021 music concert by Filipina singer Regine Velasquez
 Freedom Records, a jazz label
 USA Freedom Kids, American musical group

Albums
 Freedom (Akon album), 2008, or the title song
 Freedom (Amen Dunes album), 2018
 Freedom (Andy Griggs album), 2002
 Freedom (Darrell Evans album), 1998
 Freedom (Dragon Ash album), 2009
 Freedom (Eric Chou album), 2019
 Freedom (EP), a 2021 EP by Justin Bieber, or the title song
 Freedom (Journey album), 2022
 Freedom (Kenny Burrell album), recorded 1963–1964, released 1980 and 2011
 Freedom (Mandisa album), 2009
 Freedom (Michael W. Smith album), 2000
 Freedom (Rebecca Ferguson album), 2013
 Freedom (Refused album), 2015
 Freedom (Neil Young album), 1989
 Freedom (Santana album), 1987
 Freedom (Sheena Easton album), 1997
 Freedom (Trey Eley & Matthew Shell album), 2012
 Freedom (White Heart album), 1989
 Freedom (Yothu Yindi album), 1993
 Freedom, a 2016 album by Baby Woodrose

Songs
 "Freedom" (Alice Cooper song), 1987, from Raise Your Fist and Yell
 "Freedom" (Beyoncé song), 2016, from Lemonade
 "Freedom" (Erasure song), 2000, from Loveboat
 "Freedom" (Faith Kakembo song), 2022
 "Freedom" (Girl Next Door song), 2010, theme song of Japanese drama Jotei Kaoruko
 "Freedom" (The Isley Brothers song), 1970, from Get into Something
 "Freedom" (Jimi Hendrix song), 1971, from The Cry of Love
 "Freedom" (London Boys song), 1990, from Sweet Soul Music
 "Freedom" (Nicki Minaj song), 2012, from Pink Friday: Roman Reloaded
 "Freedom" (Noiseworks song), 1990, from Love Versus Money
 "Freedom" (Paul McCartney song), 2001, from Driving Rain
 "Freedom" (Pharrell Williams song), 2015
 "Freedom" (Rage Against the Machine song), 1994
 "Freedom" (Reba McEntire song), 2019
 "Freedom" (Robert Miles song), 1997, from 23am
 "Freedom" (Solange song), from the 2004 comedy film Johnson Family Vacation
 "Freedom" (The Sons of Champlin song), 1969, from Loosen Up Naturally
 "Freedom" (Sugababes song), 2011
 "Freedom" (Wham! song), 1984, from Make It Big
 "Freedom" (Theme from Panther), 1995, from the film Panther
 "Freedun", a 2016 song by M.I.A.
 "Freedom", by Anthony Hamilton and Elayna Boynton from the Django Unchained soundtrack album
 "Freedom", an alternate name for the Aretha Franklin song "Think (Aretha Franklin song)"
 "Freedom", by Band-Maid from Brand New Maid
 "Freedom", by Charles Mingus from The Complete Town Hall Concert
 "Freedom", by David Guetta from 7
 "Freedom", by Deep Purple from the 25th anniversary reissue of Fireball
 "Freedom", by Estelle from The 18th Day
 "Freedom",  by Foxy Shazam from The Church of Rock and Roll
 "Freedom", by Gardenian from Two Feet Stand 
 "Freedom", by Maher Zain from Forgive Me
 "Freedom", an improvised song by Richie Havens based on "Sometimes I Feel Like a Motherless Child", performed at the 1969 Woodstock Festival
 "Freedom! '90", by George Michael, also covered by Robbie Williams, not to be confused with the unrelated similarly titled Wham song
 "Freedom", a single released by Grandmaster Flash and the Furious Five in 1980
 "Freedom" by Japanese metal band Blood Stain Child from the album Mozaiq
 "Freedom Come, Freedom Go",  1971 hit single by The Fortunes

Sculptures
 Freedom (Frudakis), a 2000 sculpture by Zenos Frudakis in Philadelphia, Pennsylvania, US
 Freedom (Tibor), a 1985 sculpture by Alfred Tibor in Columbus, Ohio, US
 Statue of Freedom, an 1863 sculpture by Thomas Crawford atop the dome of the US Capitol
Miss Freedom, 1889 statue on the dome of the Georgia State Capitol (US)
 Freedom Sculpture, a 2017 sculpture by Cecil Balmond in Los Angeles, California, US

Other arts
 Freedom: The Underground Railroad, a 2013 board game about the Abolitionist Movement in the 1800s in the United States
 Chris Pape, known as Freedom, a 20th-century American graffiti artist
 Freedom, a Bald Eagle from the 1985 TV series G.I. Joe: A Real American Hero

Mathematics and physics
 Asymptotic freedom, a concept in particle physics
 Degrees of freedom, the number of parameters of a system that can vary independently
 Six degrees of freedom, describing the motion of an object in 3-dimensional space 
 Systolic freedom, a concept in mathematics

Press
 Freedom of the press, the freedom of communication and expression through various media
 Freedom Communications, a privately held national media company headquartered in Irvine, California
 Freedom (magazine), a Scientology publication
 Freedom (British newspaper), an anarchist newspaper
 Freedom (American newspaper), an African-American newspaper
 Freedom Press, a British anarchist publishing house

Sports
 Florence Freedom, the former name of the Florence Y'alls, an independent minor league baseball team that plays in the Frontier League
 Washington Freedom, a women's professional soccer (football) team
 Freedom Chiya (born 1979), South African beach volleyball player
 Freedom (gamer), stage name of StarCraft player Chang Youngsuk

Other uses
 Freedom (Azerbaijan), an electoral alliance in Azerbaijan
 Freedom (charity), a UK charity dedicated to helping victims of forced marriage
 Freedom of the City, an honour bestowed by a municipality upon a valued member of the community or an important visitor
 Freedom, Inc., a 1961 political organization of African-American political activists in Kansas City, Missouri
 Freedom Furniture, a furniture retailer in Australia and New Zealand

See also
 Free (disambiguation)
 Freed (disambiguation)
 FREEДОМ